The Belcher–Ogden Mansion; Benjamin Price House; and Price–Brittan House Historic District is a  historic district in Elizabeth, Union County, New Jersey, United States. It was listed on the National Register of Historic Places in 1986. It is located near Boxwood Hall and is in the heart of colonial Elizabethtown, the first English-speaking settlement in what became the Province of New Jersey.

Belcher–Ogden House

The Belcher–Ogden House was built in 1742 and was added to the National Register of Historic Places on November 2, 1978.

Nathaniel Bonnell House

The Nathaniel Bonnell House, at 1045 East Jersey Street, is the oldest house in Elizabeth. Nathaniel Bonnell, a native of New Haven, Connecticut, and a member of Elizabeth's incorporating organization, the Elizabeth Associates, built the house himself sometime before 1682—some think as early as 1670 with the birth of his first child. Bonnell served as a member of the General Assembly of the Province of New Jersey in 1692 and the last official reference to him is as a signer of the 1696 petition for relief against the oppression of the Lords Proprietor.

See also
First Presbyterian Church of Elizabeth
Jonathan Belcher
Jonathan Belcher (jurist)
Aaron Ogden
List of museums in New Jersey
List of the oldest buildings in New Jersey

References

Geography of Elizabeth, New Jersey
Houses completed in 1742
Houses completed in 1682
Houses in Union County, New Jersey
Houses on the National Register of Historic Places in New Jersey
Historic districts in Union County, New Jersey
National Register of Historic Places in Union County, New Jersey
1742 establishments in New Jersey
New Jersey Register of Historic Places
Historic districts on the National Register of Historic Places in New Jersey